Shahidul Islam Khan is a Jatiya Party (Ershad) politician and a former Jatiya Sangsad member representing the Sirajganj-5 constituency during 1988–1990.

Personal life
On 16 September 2020, Khan's son, Asif Imtiaz Khan, a Supreme Court lawyer, died after falling from a building in Kathalbagan, Dhaka.

References

Living people
People from Sirajganj District
Jatiya Party politicians
4th Jatiya Sangsad members
Year of birth missing (living people)
Place of birth missing (living people)